Manulea ussurica is a moth of the family Erebidae. It is found in the Russian Far East (Primorye), China (Dunbei, Shanxi, Shaanxi, Jiangsu, Hunan, Zhejiang, Yunan) and Korea.

Subspecies
Manulea ussurica ussurica
Manulea ussurica shansica (Daniel, 1954) (China)

References

Moths described in 1954
Lithosiina